Charles Booth may refer to:

Politics
 Charles Booth (diplomat) (1925–1997), British ambassador to Burma, 1978–1982
 Charles Erwin Booth (1840–1907), Republican member of the Wisconsin State Assembly
 Charles Stephen Booth (1897–1988), Canadian member of parliament, 1940–45
 Charles Steven Booth, Canadian diplomat, representative to the International Civil Aviation Organization, 1947–54

Sports
 Charles Booth (footballer) (1869–1898), English footballer
 Charlie Booth (1903–2008), Australian athlete credited for co-inventing starting blocks for sprinting races
 Charlie Booth (footballer) (1897–?), English footballer
 Charlie Booth (soccer) (born 1997), American soccer player
 Charlie Booth (rugby league), English rugby league footballer of the 1930s, 1940s and 1950s

Other
 Charles Booth (bishop) (died 1535), Tudor bishop of Hereford
 Charles O'Hara Booth (1800–1851), British commandant-in-chief of Port Arthur penal colony, Tasmania
 Charles Booth (social reformer) (1840–1916), British philanthropist
 Frederick Charles Booth (1890–1960), Victoria Cross winner
 Charles G. Booth (1896–1949), American writer of detective fiction